The South West Region is a multi-member electoral region of the Western Australian Legislative Council the South West, Peel and part of the Great Southern regions of the state. It was created by the Acts Amendment (Electoral Reform) Act 1987, and became effective on 22 May 1989 with seven members who had been elected at the 1989 state election three months earlier. At the 2008 election, it was reduced to six members. The region includes the cities of Albany, Bunbury and Mandurah.

Legislation to abolish the region, along with all other Western Australian Electoral Regions was passed in November 2021, with the 2025 state election to use a single state-wide electorate of 37 members.

Geography
The Region is made up of several complete Legislative Assembly districts, which change at each distribution.

Representation

Distribution of seats

Members
Since its creation, the electorate has had 17 members. Four of these members had previously been members of the Legislative Council—Beryl Jones (Lower West Province), Bill Stretch (Lower Central Province), Doug Wenn and Barry House (both South West Province).

Election Results

2021

2017

References

South West